Rakhine United FC Football Club is a professional football club based in Rakhine State that plays in the Myanmar National League. At the end of the 2016 season, Rakhapura United FC finished in 10th position. Rakhine United FC's biggest win was a 7-2 victory in General Aung San Cup against Manaw Myay.

Sponsorship

Club

Coaching staff
{|class="wikitable"
|-
!Position
!Staff
|-
|Manager|| U Aung Zaw Myo
|-
|rowspan="3"|Assistant Manager|| U Maung Maung Myint
|-
| U Nyunt Win
|-
|U Kyaing Than 
|-
|Goalkeeper Coach|| U Aye Thar
|-
|Fitness Coach|| U Nan Da Kyaw
|-
|Youth Team Head Coach|| U Nan Da Kyaw
|-

Other information

|-

Squad information

First team squad

Transfer

In
Nyi Nyi Min – from Chin United
Chan Nyein Kyaw – from Ayeyawady United
Dway Ko Ko Chit – from Yadanarbon FC
 Naing Lin Tun Kyaw – from Zwekapin United
Saw Kyaw Thet Oo – from Zwekapin United
 Kyaw Kyaw Htet – from Zeya Shwe Myay 
 Tay Zar Aung – from Yangon United

Out
Min Ko Thu – to Hantharwady United 
Thura Ko Ko – to Hantharwady United 
 Thiha Aung – to Hantharwady United 
 Myat Kyaw Moe Oo – to Hantharwady United 
 Sithu Than Soe – to Hantharwady United 
 Pyi Moe – to Zeyar Shwe Myay FC
 Aung Soe Moe – to Magwe
 Naing Naing Kyaw – to Magwe
 Pyae Phyo Ko Ko – to Zeyar Shwe Myay FC
 Wai Phyo Lwin – to Zeyar Shwe Myay FC

References
Myanmar - Rakhapura United FC
Myanmar National League - Rakhapura United FC

External links 

 

Rakhine United